"Spaz" is a song by American funk rock and hip hop group N.E.R.D released as the second single from their third studio album Seeing Sounds. The song peaked at number six on the U.S. Billboard Bubbling Under Hot 100 Singles chart upon release in 2008. The group performed the song at the 2008 BET Hip Hop Awards, and were joined on stage by fellow American rappers Lil Wayne, Busta Rhymes, T-Pain, Swizz Beatz and Common (who had performed "Universal Mind Control" with Pharrell before the song).

Music video
The music video for the single, shot in black-and-white, features live footage of a Brixton Academy concert on June 14, 2008 and at Madison Square Garden during Kanye West's Glow in the Dark Tour. It was directed by Robert Hales.

Legacy
The song was featured on NBA 2K9, NBA Live 09, Zune AD and the reveal trailer of Watch Dogs 2, which later became the official Radio in-game track. American alternative hip hop artist Kid Cudi sampled “Spaz” for his song “Cudi Spazzin’” from his 2008 mixtape A Kid Named Cudi.

Track listing

Digital download
"Spaz"

Charts

References

2008 singles
N.E.R.D. songs
Music videos directed by Robert Hales
Song recordings produced by the Neptunes
Songs written by Pharrell Williams
2008 songs
Black-and-white music videos